Jamar is a village and former Rajput petty princely state on Saurashtra peninsula, in Gujarat, western India.

History
The princely state, in Jhalawar prant, was ruled by Jhala Rajputs.

In 1901 it comprised only a single village, with a population of 289, yielding 3960 Rupees state revenue (1903-4, all from land), paying 288 Rupees tribute, to the British.

References

Villages in Surendranagar district
Princely states of Gujarat